Duncan John MacDowall (born 18 December 1963) is an English former professional footballer who played in the Football League for Birmingham City. He played as a centre forward.

MacDowall was born in Paddington, London. He joined Birmingham City as an apprentice in 1980, and after some promising performances in the reserves, made his First Division debut on 23 March 1982 in a goalless draw at Tottenham Hotspur. He played once more that season, but then left the club. He played for Leatherhead on a non-contract basis during the 1982–83 season.

References

1963 births
Living people
Footballers from Paddington
English footballers
Association football forwards
Birmingham City F.C. players
Leatherhead F.C. players
English Football League players